Order of the Republika Srpska is the highest decoration of Republika Srpska. It was established on April 25, 1993 by the decision of the National Assembly of Republika Srpska. The medal may be awarded on a necklace or strips with the order star worn on the breast. Like every order in Republika Srpska, the Order of Republika Srpska also has a statute defining terms about the order.

Order of Republika Srpska on necklace 
By statute it may be given to heads of foreign countries, most prominent persons for excellent work and merits of that person and strengthening national consciousness during the fight for freedom and independence, or to persons who have made significant contributions to the creation of Republika Srpska. Also by criteria of awarding it is defined to be given more precisely to presidents of states, exceptional persons and institutions that gave contribution by its function to fight of Serbian people in creation of the state. It is the privilege of the President of Republika Srpska.

This order has three elements: Order insignia, Order necklace and Order star.

Recipients

Order of Republika Srpska on necklace
 2023 -  Vladimir Putin  (by Milorad Dodik, President of Republika Srpska)
 2019 -  Ana Brnabić (by Željka Cvijanović, President of Republika Srpska)
 2018 -  Sergey Lavrov (by Milorad Dodik, President of Republika Srpska)
 2018 -  Valentina Matviyenko (by Milorad Dodik, President of Republika Srpska)
 2018 -  Aleksandar Vučić (by Milorad Dodik, President of Republika Srpska)
 2009 -  Serbian Patriarch Pavle (by Rajko Kuzmanović, President of Republika Srpska)
 1994 -  Slobodan Milošević (by Radovan Karadžić, President of Republika Srpska)

Order of Republika Srpska on sash
 2022 -  Ivica Dačić (by Željka Cvijanović, President of Republika Srpska)
 2021 -  Peter Handke (by Željka Cvijanović, President of Republika Srpska)
 2018 -  Georgy Poltavchenko (by Milorad Dodik, President of Republika Srpska)
 2018 -  Heinz-Christian Strache
 2018 -  Tomislav Nikolić (by Milorad Dodik, President of Republika Srpska)
 2013 -  Novak Djokovic (by Milorad Dodik, President of Republika Srpska)
 2013 -  Military Medical Academy
 2012 -  Arie Livne
 2012 -  Vojislav Koštunica (by Milorad Dodik, President of Republika Srpska)
 2012 -  Boris Tadić (by Milorad Dodik, President of Republika Srpska)
 2012 -  Dragan Čavić
 2012 -  Grigorije Durić
 2012 -  Mirko Šarović
 2012 -  Nikola Poplašen
 2012 -  Rajko Kuzmanović
 2011 -  Serbian Patriarch Irinej (by Milorad Dodik, President of Republika Srpska)
 2009 -  Milorad Dodik
 1994 -  Radovan Karadžić
 1994 -  Ratko Mladić
 1994 -  Momčilo Krajišnik
 1994 -  Biljana Plavšić
 1994 -  Nikola Koljević

See also 
 Orders, decorations and medals of Republika Srpska

References 

History of Republika Srpska
Awards established in 1993
Orders, decorations, and medals of Republic of Srpska